Julius Brink (born 6 July 1982 in Münster) is a beach volleyball player from Germany, who won the gold medal in the men's beach team competition at the 2006 European Beach Volleyball Championships in The Hague, Netherlands, partnering Christoph Dieckmann. He took part at the Olympic Games in 2008.

In 2009 he and his current partner Jonas Reckermann won four FIVB competitions (three consecutive Grand Slams) and the German Masters of the CEV European Championship Tour. This includes the 2009 FIVB World Championship, held from 26 June to 5 July in Stavanger, Norway, beating top seeded Harley/Alison in the final and former FIVB world champions and gold medalist of the 2008 Summer Olympics Rogers/Dalhausser in the semi final. They are the first German and European team ever to win a world championship title and are currently ranked 22nd on the FIVB World Tour (as of 23 July 2012).

On 9 August 2012, Brink and his teammate Jonas Reckermann won the gold medal at the 2012 London Olympics. With this victory Germany become the first European country to win the Beach Volleyball in Olympics.

Playing partners 
 Kjell Schneider
 Rudiger Strosik
 Markus Dieckmann
 Christoph Dieckmann
 Jonas Reckermann

Sponsors 
 Swatch

References

External links 
 
 Entry in the Leverkusen who's who
 Swatch FIVB World Tour
 CEV European Championship Tour
 Homepage of Brink Reckermann (German)

1982 births
Living people
German men's beach volleyball players
Beach volleyball players at the 2008 Summer Olympics
Beach volleyball players at the 2012 Summer Olympics
Olympic beach volleyball players of Germany
Olympic gold medalists for Germany
Olympic medalists in beach volleyball
Medalists at the 2012 Summer Olympics
Sportspeople from Münster